Pdr or PDR may refer to:

Government
 Preliminary Design Review, a step in the engineering design process
 Purchase of development rights — see Conservation easement
 Petition for Discretionary Review - In appellate law, a way of seeking review by a higher court when no appeal of right exists

People
 Paul di Resta (born 1986), British racing driver
 Pedro de la Rosa (born 1971), Spanish racing driver
 Portia de Rossi (born 1973), Australian and American actress

Places
 Peripheral Distributor Road (Cardiff)—see A4232 road
 Peripheral Distributor Road (Port Talbot)—see A4241 road 
 Playa del Rey, Los Angeles, California

Science
 Physicians' Desk Reference
 Proliferative Diabetic Retinopathy
 Pulsed Dose Rate, a form of brachytherapy
 Pharma Documentation Ring
 Photodissociation region

Other
 Democratic Republican Party (Portugal) (Partido Democrático Republicano), a Portuguese political party
 Magpul PDR (Personal Defense Rifle)
 Paintless dent repair, also known as paintless dent removal
 Partido para sa Demokratikong Reporma, a Philippine political party
 Pedestrian Dead Reckoning
 People's Democratic Republic
 Personal development reviews are a year-round process with an annual review meeting to summarise the year gone and plan the year ahead.
 Population and Development Review